Twentieth Century Pictures, Inc. was an independent Hollywood motion picture production company created in 1933 by Joseph Schenck (the former president of United Artists) and Darryl F. Zanuck from Warner Bros. Financial backing came from Schenck's younger brother Nicholas Schenck, president of Loew's, the theater chain that owned Metro-Goldwyn-Mayer (MGM), Louis B. Mayer of MGM, who wanted a position for his son-in-law, William Goetz, Bank of America and Herbert J. Yates  owner of the film processing laboratory Consolidated Film Industries, who later founded Republic Pictures Corporation in 1935.
. The company product was distributed by United Artists (UA), and leased space at Samuel Goldwyn Studios.

Schenck was President of Twentieth Century, while Zanuck was named Production Chief and Goetz and Raymond Griffith served as vice-presidents. Their initial stars under contract were George Arliss, Constance Bennett, and Loretta Young; however the Goetz connection meant that talent could be borrowed from MGM. The company released its first film, The Bowery, on October 7, 1933. The company was successful from the very beginning; out of their first 18 films, only one, Born to Be Bad, was not a financial success. Their 1934 production, The House of Rothschild was nominated for an Academy Award for Best Picture. In 1935, they produced the classic film Les Misérables, from Victor Hugo's novel, which was also nominated for Best Picture.

In the winter of 1934, Zanuck began to negotiate with the UA board to acquire stock of the company and become a board member, but became outraged by UA's co-founder Mary Pickford's refusal to reward Twentieth Century with the company's stock, fearing it would have diluted the value of holdings by another UA stockholder and co-founder, D.W. Griffith. Schenck, who had been a UA stockholder for over ten years, resigned from United Artists in protest of the shoddy treatment of Twentieth Century, and Zanuck; thus began discussions with other distributors, which led to talks with the bankrupt Fox Studios of the Fox Film Corporation in the early spring of 1935. Fox Film had begun in the silent era in 1915 under founder William Fox.

Twentieth Century Pictures of 1933 merged with Fox Studios in 1935 to form 20th Century-Fox (the hyphen was dropped half a century later in 1985 under Australian Rupert Murdoch). For many years, 20th Century Fox claimed to have been founded in 1915. For instance, it marked 1945 as its 30th anniversary. However, in recent years it has now claimed the 1935 merger as its founding date.

Films

References

Twentieth Century Pictures
Mass media companies established in 1933
American companies established in 1933
Mass media companies disestablished in 1935
American companies disestablished in 1935
Defunct American film studios
20th Century Studios
Defunct organizations based in Hollywood, Los Angeles
Defunct companies based in Greater Los Angeles
Entertainment companies based in California
1933 establishments in California
1935 disestablishments in California
Film production companies of the United States
Film studios in Southern California